Samuel Vázquez (born 3 May 1984 in Leominster) is an American-born Puerto Rican middle-distance runner.  He competed in the 1500 metres competition at the 2012 Summer Olympics.

References 

1984 births
Living people
Puerto Rican male middle-distance runners
Olympic track and field athletes of Puerto Rico
Athletes (track and field) at the 2012 Summer Olympics
Arkansas Razorbacks men's track and field athletes